Carlo Toniatti (11 January 1892 – 1968) was an Italian rower who competed in the 1924 Summer Olympics. He was born in Zadar, Austria-Hungary. In 1924 he won the bronze medal as crew member of the Italian boat in the men's eight competition.

References

External links
Carlo Toniatti's profile at databaseOlympics
Carlo Toniatti's profile at the Italian Olympic Committee

1892 births
1968 deaths
Sportspeople from Zadar
Italian male rowers
Olympic bronze medalists for Italy
Olympic rowers of Italy
Rowers at the 1924 Summer Olympics
Olympic medalists in rowing
Medalists at the 1924 Summer Olympics
European Rowing Championships medalists